Dagenham was a borough constituency represented in the House of Commons of the UK Parliament that elected one Member of Parliament (MP) by the first past the post system of election. It was replaced at the 2010 general election largely by Dagenham and Rainham.

Boundaries

1945–1974: The Borough of Dagenham.

1974–1983: The London Borough of Barking wards of Chadwell Heath, Eastbrook, Fanshawe, Heath, River, Valence, and Village.

1983–2010: The London Borough of Barking and Dagenham wards of Alibon, Chadwell Heath, Eastbrook, Fanshawe, Heath, Marks Gate, River, Triptons, Valence, and Village.

2010 Boundary change
Following their review of parliamentary representation in North London, the Boundary Commission for England created a new constituency of Dagenham and Rainham.

History
History of Boundaries
Before 1945 this Dagenham constituency and surrounding area was part of the Romford constituency.

Political History
The MP for the predecessor seat since 1935, Labour's John Parker, stood again on each occasion in this smaller successor area, representing it until 1983. Parker was the last serving MP to have been elected before the Second World War, and with 48 years in Parliament, remained the longest-serving Labour MP in history until Dennis Skinner served Bolsover for 49 years.

Dagenham was held by Labour since its inception and election predictions always rated it as a safe seat. Dagenham hosts an at times shrinking skilled manual industry such as the Ford Motor Company works, which downscaled production in 2001, leading to replacement distribution and warehousing businesses as well as local regeneration under the Thames Gateway project from 2005 however higher than national unemployment immediately, including following the seat's abolition. (See the main successor seat, Dagenham and Rainham for statistics.) The largest-polling opposition candidate was Conservative since 1979, with the Liberal Party a greater or equal opponent in elections before that, vying for second place with that party.

Unusually, the far-right British National Party (BNP) was very active in this area periodically and its support led to some retained deposits by polling more than 5% of the vote on several occasions. Their candidate received nearly 10% of the vote in the 2005 general election and in the 2006 local elections returned 12 councillors to Barking and Dagenham London Borough Council.

The new constituency of Dagenham and Rainham included wards which had not traditionally supported the BNP or Labour, and published leaks of BNP databases that year showed that its membership in the area shown was diminishing.

Members of Parliament

Election results

Elections in the 1940s

Elections in the 1950s

Elections in the 1960s

Elections in the 1970s

Elections in the 1980s

Elections in the 1990s

Elections in the 2000s

See also
List of parliamentary constituencies in London

References

Politics of the London Borough of Barking and Dagenham
Constituencies of the Parliament of the United Kingdom established in 1945
Constituencies of the Parliament of the United Kingdom disestablished in 2010
Parliamentary constituencies in London (historic)
Dagenham